Theophilus Cooper may refer to :

Theophilus Cooper (Australian politician) (1827–1912), member of the New South Wales Legislative Assembly
Theophilus Cooper (New Zealand judge) (1850–1925), New Zealand compositor, lawyer and judge